Stolen Eyes (translit. Otkradnati ochi) is a 2005 Bulgarian drama film. It was Bulgaria's submission to the 78th Academy Awards for the Academy Award for Best Foreign Language Film and it was entered into the 27th Moscow International Film Festival where Vesela Kazakova won the award for Best Actress. It is the story of a fraught relationship between a Christian man and a Muslim Turkish woman in the 1980s.

Cast
 Vesela Kazakova as Ayten
 Valeri Yordanov as Ivan
 Nejat Isler as Bratat / Brother
 Itzhak Finzi as Dyadoto / Grandfather
 Iliana Kitanova as Lekarkata / Lady doctor
 Stoyan Aleksiev as Ofitzer ot DS / KGB police officer
 Maria Kavardjikova as Valya "kosmonavtkata" / Valya "space woman"
 Maria Statulova as Selyanka / Peasant woman

References

External links

2005 films
2005 drama films
2000s Bulgarian-language films
Films shot in Bulgaria
Bulgarian drama films